Computational semiotics is an interdisciplinary field that applies, conducts, and draws on research in logic, mathematics, the theory and practice of computation, formal and natural language studies, the cognitive sciences generally, and semiotics proper. The term encompasses both the application of semiotics to computer hardware and software design and, conversely, the use of computation for performing semiotic analysis. The former focuses on what semiotics can bring to computation; the latter on what computation can bring to semiotics.

Semiotics of computation 
A common theme of this work is the adoption of a sign-theoretic perspective on issues of artificial intelligence and knowledge representation.  Many of its applications lie in the field of human-computer interaction (HCI) and fundamental devices of recognition.

One part of this field, known as algebraic semiotics, combines aspects of algebraic specification and social semiotics, and has been applied to user interface design and to the representation of mathematical proofs.

Computational methods for semiotics 
This strand involves formalizing semiotic methods of analysis and implementing them as algorithms on computers to process large digital data sets. These data sets are typically textual but semiotics opens the way for analysis of all manner of other data. Existing work provides methods for automated opposition analysis and generation of semiotic squares; metaphor identification; and image analysis. Shackell has suggested that a new field of Natural Semiotic Processing should emerge to extend natural language processing into areas such as persuasive technology, marketing and brand analysis that have significant cultural or non-linguistic aspects. On the other side, Meunier argues that semiotics and computation are compatible and combining them provides more logical consistency in understanding forms of meaning.

See also

 Artificial intelligence
 Computational linguistics
 Computer-human interaction
 Formal language
 Information theory
 Knowledge representation
 Computational semantics
 Logic of information
 Meaning
 Natural language
 Relational database
 Semiotic engineering
 Semiotic information theory
 User interface

References

Further reading
 Meunier, J.G. (2021). Computational Semiotics, Bloomsburry Academic.
 Andersen, P.B. (1991). A Theory of Computer Semiotics, Cambridge University Press.
 de Souza, C.S., The Semiotic Engineering of Human-Computer Interaction, MIT Press, Cambridge, MA, 2005.
 Tanaka-Ishii, K. (2010), "Semiotics of Programming", Cambridge University Press.
 Hugo, J. (2005), "The Semiotics of Control Room Situation Awareness", Fourth International Cyberspace Conference on Ergonomics, Virtual Conference, 15 Sep – 15 Oct 2005.  Eprint
 Gudwin, R.; Queiroz J. (eds) - Semiotics and Intelligent Systems Development - Idea Group Publishing, Hershey PA, USA (2006),  (hardcover), 1-59904-064-6 (softcover), 1-59904-065-4 (e-book), 352 ps. Link to publisher
 Gudwin, R.; Queiroz, J. - Towards an Introduction to Computational Semiotics - Proceedings of the 2005 IEEE International Conference on Integration of Knowledge Intensive Multi-Agent Systems - KIMAS'05, 18–21 April 2005, Waltham, MA, USA, pp. 393–398.IEEExplore
 Mili, A., Desharnais, J., Mili, F., with Frappier, M., Computer Program Construction, Oxford University Press, New York, NY, 1994.  — Introduction to Tarskian relation theory and its applications within the relational programming paradigm.
 Rieger, Burghard B.: Computing Granular Word Meanings. A fuzzy linguistic approach to Computational Semiotics, in: Wang, Paul P. (ed.): Computing with Words. [Wiley Series on Intelligent Systems 3], New York (John Wiley & Sons) 2001, pp. 147–208.
 Rieger, Burghard B.: Computing Fuzzy Semantic Granules from Natural Language Texts. A computational semiotics approach to understanding word meanings, in: Hamza, M.H. (ed.): Artificial Intelligence and Soft Computing, Proceedings of the IASTED International Conference, Anaheim/ Calgary/ Zürich (IASTED/ Acta Press) 1999, pp. 475–479.
 Rieger, Burghard B.: A Systems Theoretical View on Computational Semiotics. Modeling text understanding as meaning constitution by SCIPS, in: Proceedings of the Joint IEEE Conference on the Science and Technology of Intelligent Systems (ISIC/CIRA/ISAS-98), Piscataway, NJ (IEEE/Omnipress) 1998, pp. 840–845. IEEExplore

External links
 Goguen, J., Algebraic Semiotics
 Gudwin, R.R., Computational Semiotics
 Gudwin, R.R., List of Publications in Computational Semiotics and other fields
 International Computational Semiotics Group
 UNICAMP Computational Semiotics Group

Semiotics
Theory of computation
Cognitive science
Computational fields of study